Kristaq Dhamo (20 April 1933 – 14 August 2022) was an Albanian actor and film director. He was awarded the People's Artist of Albania medal. His 1958 film Tana was entered into the 1st Moscow International Film Festival.

Dhamo died on 14 August 2022, at the age of 89.

Filmography

Actor 
Botë e padukshme (1987)
Vendimi (1984)
Qortimet e vjeshtës (1982)
Brazdat (1973)
Mëngjeze lufte (1971)
Miqësi revolucionare (1967)
Ata nuk vdesin (1966)
Vitet e para (1965)
Detyrë e posaçme (1963)
Ansambli i këngëve dhe valleve (1960)
Fortuna (1959)
Ne u dashuruam me Shqipërinë (1959)
Tana (1958)

Director 
Botë e padukshme (1987)
Qortimet e vjeshtës (1982)
Nga mesi i errësirës (1978)
Vitet e para (1965)
Ansambli i këngëve dhe valleve (1960)
Tana (1958) – first Albanian long movie

References

1933 births
2022 deaths
Albanian male film actors
Albanian film directors
People's Artists of Albania
People from Fier